The following is a list of events relating to television in Ireland from 1977.

Events
5 July – Pádraig Faulkner is appointed Minister for Posts and Telegraphs.
Undated – RTÉ Television begins new programming schedule policy for its prime time evening slot (8–10 p.m.).

Debuts
20 January – Time Now Mr T (1977)

Ongoing television programmes
RTÉ News: Nine O'Clock (1961–present)
RTÉ News: Six One (1962–present)
The Late Late Show (1962–present)
The Riordans (1965–1979)
Quicksilver (1965–1981)
Wanderly Wagon (1967–1982)
Hall's Pictorial Weekly (1971–1980)
Sports Stadium (1973–1997)
Trom agus Éadrom (1975–1985)
The Late Late Toy Show (1975–present)

Ending this year
17 March – Time Now Mr T (1977)

Births
12 May – Laura Woods, television presenter and former radio continuity announcer
18 August – Elaine Crowley, journalist, newsreader and television presenter
27 December – Sinead Keenan, actress

See also
1977 in Ireland

References

 
1970s in Irish television